BE 12 may refer to:

Royal Aircraft Factory B.E.12, aircraft in World War I
Beriev Be-12, aircraft in the Cold War
 Beryllium-12 (Be-12 or 12Be), an isotope of beryllium